Constantine "Costa" Manos (born 1934 in South Carolina) is a Greek-American photographer known for his images of Boston and Greece. His work has been published in Esquire, Life, and Look. He is a member of Magnum Photos.

Career 
Manos first began taking photographs while in high school when he joined his school's camera club. Within a few years, he was working professionally as a photographer. At 19, Manos was hired as the official photographer for the Boston Symphony Orchestra at Tanglewood. His photographs of the orchestra culminated in 1961 with his first published work, Portrait of a Symphony.

Manos graduated from the University of South Carolina in 1955, majoring in English Literature. He served in the military and then moved to New York City, working for various magazines. From 1961-64, Manos lived in Greece, photographing people and landscapes. This work resulted in A Greek Portfolio, published in 1972,  which won awards at Arles and the Leipzig book fair. In 1963, Manos joined Magnum Photos and became a full member in 1965.

After his time in Greece, Manos lived in Boston. In 1974, he was hired by the city to create the photographs for the Where's Boston? exhibition, a large production in honor of Boston's 200th anniversary. The photos from that exhibit were published in the book Bostonians: Photographs from Where's Boston? Manos also worked on projects for Time-Life Books.

In 1995, American Color was published, containing Manos' recent photographs of American people. A Greek Portfolio was reissued in 1999, followed by a major exhibition of his work at the Benaki Museum of Athens. In 2003, Manos was awarded the Leica Medal of Excellence for his American Color photographs.

Manos continues to photograph with Leica cameras, and is currently working on material for a second American Color collection.

Bibliography 
 American Color 2. United States: Quantuck Lane Press, 2010. 
 Portrait of a Symphony 1960-2000. United States: Boston Symphony Orchestra, 2000.
 A Greek Portfolio. United States: Ilios Press, 1999. 
 American Color. United States: W.W. Norton, 1995. 
 Bostonians. United States: Cambridge Seven Associates, 1975. ASIN B000Q6RVVO
 Where's Boston?, United States: Cambridge Seven Associates, 1975.
 Suite Grecque, France: Le Chêne, 1972.
 A Greek Portfolio, United States: Studio Book/Viking Press, 1972. ASIN B001U6FOA4
 Portrait of a Symphony, United States: Basic Books, 1961. ASIN B0007DT5NI

Collections 
 Museum of Modern Art, New York, USA
 Art Institute of Chicago, Chicago, USA
 Museum of Fine Arts, Boston, USA
 George Eastman House, Rochester, USA
 High Museum of Art, Atlanta, USA
 Bibliothèque Nationale, Paris, France
 Houston Museum of Fine Arts, Houston, USA
 Chrysler Museum, Norfolk, USA
 Southeast Museum of Photography, Daytona Beach, USA
 Benaki Museum, Athens, Greece
 Magnum Photos Collections, Harry Ransom Center, University of Texas at Austin, USA

References

External links 
 Official Website
  Magnum Page

American photographers
Magnum photographers
Living people
1934 births
American people of Greek descent